The RPG-40 was an anti-tank hand grenade developed by the Soviet Union in 1940.

Description
Upon contact,  of explosives contained within it were detonated and produced a blast effect. This made the grenade very effective against earlier German tanks, but ineffective against later models, such as the Panzer IV and the Panzer V, leading to the RPG-43 replacing it in 1943.

Users

See also
 List of Russian weaponry
 No. 73 Grenade

References

External links
 Soviet Grenades at LoneSentry.com

Hand grenades of the Soviet Union
Anti-tank grenades
World War II infantry weapons of the Soviet Union
Weapons and ammunition introduced in 1940